Yves Malartic (1910–1986) was a French writer. He won the Prix des Deux Magots in 1948 for his novel Au Pays du Bon Dieu. He also wrote a biography of Tenzing Norgay in 1954 and was one of the translators of works by the American writer Chester Himes.

References
"Histoire de la traduction en Occident: France, Grande-Bretagne, Allemagne, Russie, Pays-Bas"

1910 births
1986 deaths
20th-century French novelists
French crime fiction writers
English–French translators
Spanish–French translators
Prix des Deux Magots winners
20th-century translators